The Private Repress is a remix album by American hip hop producer DJ Shadow, released exclusively in Japan by Island Records on March 29, 2003. It contains the remixed tracks and the B-side tracks from The Private Press.

Track listing

Personnel
Credits adapted from liner notes.

 DJ Shadow – production, arrangement, design
 Keith Tamashiro – design
 B+ – photography

References

External links
 
 

2003 remix albums
DJ Shadow albums